The 2010–11 Slovak Women's First League was the 17th edition of the premier category for women's football clubs in Slovakia, running between 28 August 2010 and 7 May 2011. Ten teams took part in the competition, with newly promoted Ajax Pakostov and Topvar Topolcany joining SK Juventus Zilina, Lady Team Bratislava, SK Selce, TJ Skloplast Trnava, Slovan Bratislava, Slovan Duslo Sala, Slovan Trencianske Teplice and SK Stich Humenné.

Defending champion Slovan Bratislava won its tenth championship and the third one in a row, qualifying for the 2011-12 Champions League, while Slovan Duslo Sala was again the runner-up one point behind and Topvar Topolcany was third in its debut. SK Selce was relegated as the bottom team, and third-to-last Skloplast Trnava also lost the category.

Table

Results

References

Women's First League
Slov
Women's football competitions in Slovakia